Ankiaka Be Nord or Ankiakabe is a commune in northern Madagascar. It belongs to the district of Andapa, which is a part of Sava Region. According to 2001 census the population of Ankiaka Be Nord was 8,253.

Only primary schooling is available in town. The majority 98% of the population are farmers.  The most important crop is rice, while other important products are coffee, beans and vanilla.  Industry and services provide employment for 0.05% and 1.94% of the population, respectively. Additionally fishing employs 0.01% of the population.

References and notes 

Populated places in Sava Region